The 1993 Invercargill mayoral by-election was held on 20 March 1993 as a result of the death of Mayor Eve Poole on Boxing Day the previous year.

Background
Since losing the Waitemata City mayoralty in 1989, Tim Shadbolt had made several unsuccessful electoral runs, including 1992 mayoral elections in Auckland and Dunedin, in both of which he placed third.

The election attracted an unusually large pool of 14 candidates, including the incumbent deputy mayor and the two deputy mayors preceding him. Former Southland County Council chairman and father of candidate Janet Malloch, Sir Erskine Bowmar, described it as "a bit of a joke".

Polling

Results
The following table gives the election results:

References

1993 elections in New Zealand
Mayoral elections in Invercargill
March 1993 events in New Zealand